"Mentirosa" (lit. "liar" (female)) is a single by Mellow Man Ace from his debut album, Escape from Havana. It was one of the first songs produced by Tony G, with scratches provided by Tony's fellow DJ at Los Angeles' KDAY radio station, Julio G (no relation, despite internet sites calling him Tony's brother). The song was Mellow Man Ace's lone hit single, peaking at number 14 on the Billboard Hot 100, spending 24 weeks on the chart. "Mentirosa" was additionally certified Gold by the Recording Industry Association of America, and was 99th on the Billboard Year-End Hot 100 singles of 1990. The track is performed in Spanglish, and samples "No One to Depend On" and "Evil Ways" by Santana.

Single track listing
"Mentirosa" (Radio Edit) – 4:16
"Mentirosa" (Extended Remix) – 6:08
"Welcome to My Groove" (Hurley's House of Trix Mix) – 4:30
"Welcome to My Groove" (Hurley's Deep House Mix) – 5:45
"Welcome to My Groove" (Hurley's Hip House Mix) – 5:56
"Welcome to My Groove" (Latin Hip House Mix) – 5:13

Charts

Weekly charts

Year-end charts

References

1989 songs
1990 debut singles
Spanglish songs
Capitol Records singles